WSKL 92.9 FM is a radio station broadcasting an oldies format. Licensed to Veedersburg, Indiana, the station serves the areas of Danville, Illinois and Attica, Indiana, and is owned by Zona Communications, Inc.

References

External links
WSKL's official website

SKL